JSC Dalavia, also known as Dalavia — Far Eastern Airways was an airline based in Khabarovsk, Russia.  It operated scheduled and charter flights within Russia, and international flights to Asia. Its main base was Khabarovsk Novy Airport. The Russian Government suspended its traffic rights in October 2008.

History
Khabarovsk's airport received its first concrete runway in August 1953, and in the same year Khabarovsk Aviation Enterprise was established as part of Aeroflot. Flights were initially operated by aircraft including the Polikarpov Po-2, Lisunov Li-2 and Ilyushin Il-14, and later the Tupolev Tu-154 and Ilyushin Il-62 were operated.

After the dissolution of the Soviet Union and the resultant breakup of Aeroflot, Khabarovsk Aviation Enterprise continued to operate under Aeroflot codes and in Aeroflot livery, in return for a licensing fee. On 29 March 1999, the airline began operations to Seoul in South Korea from Khabarovsk under its own codes, and with the new name of Dalavia. In December 1999 the airline started operating the route Khabarovsk-Bangkok-Singapore on a once-weekly basis.

The first Tu-214 was handed over to the airline at the KAPO plant in Kazan on 22 May 2001, in a ceremony presided over by Mintimer Shaimiyev, the President of Tatarstan.

Dalavia carried 621,405 passenger in 2004, an increase of 9.1% over the previous year. Of this, some 135,792 passengers were carried on the airline's international route network. This year the airline was given recognition as the best domestic airline in Russia in the Wings of Russia competition.

In December 2006, Dalavia signed a US$170 million deal with Sukhoi Civil Aircraft for the supply of six Sukhoi Superjet 100s, with options on an additional four airframes. From June 2007, the airline was to offer a weekly flight with Tupolev Tu-214 equipment from Anchorage, Alaska, to Petropavlovsk-Kamchatsky with a flight continuation to Khabarovsk.

On 26 January 2009, Rosaviatsiya cancelled the air operator's certificate of Dalavia. On 9 June 2009, the Arbitration Court of Khabarovsk Krai declared Dalavia bankrupt with debts almost twice the amount of its assets. Its accounts payables totalled some 1.7 billion rubles and wages for employees exceeded 350 million roubles. According to presidential decree, after the bankruptcy Dalavia was transferred to Russian Technologies when it was planned for Dalavia to enter the structure of Rosavia.

Destinations

Fleet

The Dalavia fleet included the following aircraft (at May 2008):

References

External links

  
 

Former Aeroflot divisions
Airlines established in 1953
Airlines disestablished in 2008
Companies based in Khabarovsk Krai
Defunct airlines of Russia